Chakacha is a traditional music and dance style (a ngoma) of the Swahili people of coastal Kenya and Tanzania, originally associated with weddings and performed and watched by women. In the late 20th century, musical groups such as Mombasa Roots, Safari Sound Band and Them Mushrooms have adapted this style to afropop music. The women dress in very light, transparent clothing and have a belt around their waists for ease of movement. Tanzanian ladies, especially around the coastal areas, are very good at this dance. It is also somewhat associated with Taarab, another type of music style adapted in the coast and mainly performed by women. A very popular coastal tradition, with Arabic poetry, taarab has been used as a sarcastic way of delivering a message across. 

The hip-swaying dance movements of Chakacha also bear some resemblance with both Congolese soukous dances and Middle Eastern belly dances.

References
 
 

African dances
Kenyan culture